is a district located in Sorachi Subprefecture, Hokkaido, Japan.

As of 2004, the district has an estimated population of 14,944 and a density of 19.99 persons per km2. The total area is 747.75 km2.

Towns and villages
Shintotsukawa
Tsukigata
Urausu

Districts in Hokkaido